Hapoel Ra'anana is an Israeli women's football club from Ra'anana competing in the Ligat Nashim and the Israeli Women's Cup.

History
The club was established in 2016, as part of the Hapoel Ra'anana football club and entered the league's second division ahead of the 2016–17 season .

External links
 Hapoel Ra'anana  Israeli Football Association 

Women's football clubs in Israel
Association football clubs established in 2016
2016 establishments in Israel
Sport in Ra'anana